Microhoplomelas ruficornis is a species of beetle in the family Cerambycidae, and the only species in the genus Microhoplomelas. It was described by Fairmaire in 1896.

References

Acanthocinini
Beetles described in 1896
Monotypic beetle genera
Taxa named by Stephan von Breuning (entomologist)